Daniel Yeadon is a British-born Australian cellist and viola da gambist.

Together with his partner Neal Peres Da Costa and artistic director Richard Tognetti he won the 2008 ARIA Award for Best Classical Album for the album Bach: Sonatas for Violin & Keyboard.

Yeadon is a member of Florilegium and has released albums performing with Da Costa, Genevieve Lacey, Pieter Wispelwey and Richard Egarr, amongst others.

Awards

ARIA Music Awards
The ARIA Music Awards is an annual awards ceremony that recognises excellence, innovation, and achievement across all genres of Australian music. They commenced in 1987. 

! 
|-
| 2008
| Bach Sonatas for Violin & Keyboard (with Richard Tognetti & Neal Peres Da Costa)
| Best Classical Album
| 
| 
|-

References

ARIA Award winners
English cellists
Australian cellists
LGBT classical musicians
Living people
Year of birth missing (living people)
21st-century LGBT people